Events from the year 1816 in the United States.

Incumbents

Federal Government 
 President: James Madison (DR-Virginia)
 Vice President: vacant
 Chief Justice: John Marshall (Virginia)
 Speaker of the House of Representatives: Henry Clay (DR-Kentucky)
 Congress: 14th

Events
 April 11 – In Philadelphia, the African Methodist Episcopal Church is established by Richard Allen and other African-American Methodists, the first such denomination completely independent of White churches.
 April 27 – The Dallas tariff is passed in Congress seeking to protect American manufacturing against an influx of cheaper British goods following the War of 1812.
 May 11 – The American Bible Society is founded in New York City, New York.
 June – Fort Dearborn is reestablished in the place that will become Chicago, IL.
 August 24 – The Treaty of St. Louis is signed in St. Louis, Missouri.
 November – James Monroe defeats Rufus King in the U.S. presidential election.
 November 7 – Jonathan Jennings is inaugurated as the first governor of Indiana.
 December 11 – Indiana is admitted as the 19th U.S. state (see History of Indiana).

Undated
 1816 was known as 'the year without a summer' in North America and elsewhere, with widespread unseasonal weather and crop failures. 
 The Second Bank of the United States obtains its charter.
 E. Remington and Sons (the firearm and later typewriter manufacturing company) is founded in Ilion, New York.

Births
 January 3 – Samuel C. Pomeroy, U.S. Senator from Kansas from 1861 to 1873 and railroad president (died 1891)
 January 30 – Nathaniel P. Banks, politician and general (died 1894)
 March 1 – John Souther, mechanical engineer (died 1911)
 March 14 – William Marsh Rice, university founder (died 1900)
 April 25 – Eliza Daniel Stewart, temperance leader (died 1908)
 May 3 – Montgomery C. Meigs, career United States Army officer and civil engineer, who served as Quartermaster General of the United States Army during and after the American Civil War (died 1892)
 June 19 – William Henry Webb, industrialist and philanthropist (died 1899)
 July 4 – James B. Howell, U.S. Senator from Iowa from 1870 to 1871 (died 1880)
 July 23 – Charlotte Cushman, actress (died 1876)
 July 31 – George Henry Thomas, U.S. Army general (died 1870)
 August 4
 William Julian Albert, Congressman (died 1879)
 Russell Sage, financier, railroad president and politician (died 1906)
 October 11 – William W. Eaton, U.S. Senator from Connecticut from 1875 to 1881 (died 1898)
 October 20 – James W. Grimes, U.S. Senator from Iowa from 1859 to 1869 (died 1872)
 October 26 – Philip Pendleton Cooke, lawyer and poet (died 1850)
 November 3 – Jubal Early, Confederate general (died 1894)
 November 4 – James L. Alcorn, U.S. Senator from Mississippi from 1871 to 1877 (died 1894)
 November 29
Henry Mower Rice, U.S. Senator from Minnesota from 1858 to 1863 (died 1894)
Morrison Waite, 7th Chief Justice of the Supreme Court (died 1888)
 December 12 – Thomas C. McCreery, U.S. Senator from Kentucky from 1868 to 1871 (died 1890)
 December 13 – Clement Claiborne Clay, U.S. Senator from Alabama from 1853 to 1862, Confederate States Senator from Alabama from 1862 to 1864 (died 1882)

Deaths
 April 3 – Thomas Machin, military engineer (born 1744 in Great Britain)
 May 4 – Samuel Dexter, 3rd United States Secretary of the Treasury, 4th United States Secretary of War (born 1761)
 June 25 – Hugh Henry Brackenridge, writer and Pennsylvania Supreme Court justice (born 1748 in Great Britain)
 August 12 – Mary Katherine Goddard, publisher and postmistress (born 1738)
 September 18 – Bernard McMahon, horticulturalist (born c. 1775 in Ireland)
 November 8 – Gouverneur Morris, statesman and Founding Father of the U.S. (born 1752)

See also
Timeline of United States history (1790–1819)

References

Further reading
 Merrill Moores. Indiana In 1816. Indiana Magazine of History, Vol. 12, No. 3 (1916), pp. 271–280
 
 Julian P. Boyd. John Sergeant's Mission to Europe for the Second Bank of the United States: 1816–1817. The Pennsylvania Magazine of History and Biography, Vol. 58, No. 3 (1934), pp. 213–231
 Charles G. Davis, Ninian Edwards, Wm. Clark, George Graham, Lane K. Newberry, C. J. Bulliet. The Indian Boundary Line under the Treaty of August 24, 1816. Journal of the Illinois State Historical Society, Vol. 28, No. 1 (April, 1935), pp. 26–64
 
 L. G. Moffatt, J. M. Carrière. A Frenchman Visits Norfolk, Fredericksburg and Orange County, 1816. The Virginia Magazine of History and Biography, Vol. 53, No. 2 (April, 1945), pp. 101–123
 Harold W. Ryan, George Izard. Diary of a Journey by George Izard, 1815–1816. The South Carolina Historical Magazine, Vol. 53, No. 2 (April, 1952), pp. 67–76
 
 
 Journal of the Convention of the Indiana Territory, 1816. Indiana Magazine of History, Vol. 61, No. 2 (June 1965), pp. 77–87, 89–156
 George T. Blakey. Rendezvous with Republicanism: John Pope vs. Henry Clay in 1816. Indiana Magazine of History, Vol. 62, No. 3 (September 1966), pp. 233–250
 Ronald L. Stuckey. Thomas Nuttall's 1816 Ohio Valley Plant Collections Described in His "Genera" of 1818. Castanea, Vol. 31, No. 3 (September, 1966), pp. 187–198
 William G. Morgan. The Congressional Nominating Caucus of 1816: The Struggle against the Virginia Dynasty. The Virginia Magazine of History and Biography, Vol. 80, No. 4 (October, 1972), pp. 461–475
 Joseph G. Rayback. A Myth Re-Examined: Martin van Buren's Role in the Presidential Election of 1816. Proceedings of the American Philosophical Society, Vol. 124, No. 2 (April 29, 1980), pp. 106–118
 David Hosford, Mary Bagot. Exile in Yankeeland: The Journal of Mary Bagot, 1816–1819. Records of the Columbia Historical Society, Washington, D.C., Vol. 51, [The 51st separately bound book] (1984), pp. 30–50
 Douglas R. Egerton. To the Tombs of the Capulets: Charles Fenton Mercer and Public Education in Virginia, 1816–1817. The Virginia Magazine of History and Biography, Vol. 93, No. 2 (April, 1985), pp. 155–174

External links
 

 
1810s in the United States
United States
United States
Years of the 19th century in the United States